Eshkali Zayer Hoseyn (also Romanized as Eshkālī Zāyer Ḩoseyn; also known as Aḩsḩām-e Ḩasan, Aḩshām-e Zā’er Ḩoseyn-e Ghazanfarī, Ahsham Hasan, Khasham Ḩasan, Oshkālī, Oshkālī Zā’er ’oseynī, and Shekārī-ye Zāyer Ḩoseyn) is a village in Ahram Rural District, in the Central District of Tangestan County, Bushehr Province, Iran. At the 2006 census, its population was 62, in 14 families.

References 

Populated places in Tangestan County